The Canadian Disability Hall of Fame (formerly the Terry Fox Hall of Fame), recognizes "outstanding Canadians who have made extraordinary contributions to enriching the quality of life for people with physical disabilities". It is run by the Canadian Foundation for Physically Disabled Persons and located at Metro Hall, 55 John St., in downtown Toronto. The Hall is named after Terry Fox, a cancer research activist who attempted a run across Canada, dubbed the "Marathon of Hope".

Inductees

1993
 Edwin A. Baker
 John Gibbons Counsell
 Rick Hansen
 Robert Wilson Jackson
 Margaret McLeod
 André Viger

1994
 Arnold Boldt
 William Cameron
 Beryl Potter
 Robert L. Rumball

1995
 Bruce Halliday
 Albin T. Jousse
 Jeremy Rempel
 Mona Winberg

1996
 Arlette Lefebvre
 Joanne Mucz
 Vicki Keith Munro 
 Walter Wu

1997
 Jeff Adams
 Alice Laine and Audrey Morrice	
 David Onley
 Whipper Billy Watson

1998
 Lincoln M. Alexander
 Gary Birch
 Harry Botterell
 Frank Bruno

1999
 Clifford Chadderton
 Leslie Lam
 Pier Morten
 Allan Simpson

2000
 Morris (Mickey) Milner
 Eugene Reimer
 Sarah Thompson
 Sam Sullivan

2001
 Amy Doofenbaker
 Ivy Granstrom
 Tom Hainey
 James MacDougall

2002
 Mae Brown and Joan Mactavish
 Stephanie McClellan
 Jo-Anne Robinson
 Robert Steadward

2003
 Joanne Berdan
 Jack Donohue
 Brian Keown
 Charles Tator

2004
 Carlos Costa
 Johanna Johnson
 David Lepofsky
 Henry Wohler

2005
 Peter Eriksson
 Lucy Fletcher and Robert Fletcher
 Patrick Jarvis
 Chantal Petitclerc

2006
 Michael Edgson
 Jeneece Edroff
 Steven Fletcher
 June Hooper

2007
 Elizabeth Grandbois, Builder
 Joanne Smith, Achiever
 Lauren Woolstencroft, Athlete

2008
 Adrian Anantawan, Achiever 	
 Linda Crabtree, Achiever
 Dr. Geoff Fernie, Builder
 Daniel Westley, Athlete

2009
 Jeff Healey, Achiever
 David Hingsburger, Builder
 Diane Roy, Athlete
 Jill Taylor and Gary Taylor, Achievers

2010
 Colette Bourgonje, Athlete
 Alan Dean, Builder
 David Shannon, Achiever
 Jeffrey Tiessen, Achiever

2011
 Archie Allison, Builder
 Benoit Huot, Athlete
 Brian McKeever and Robin McKeever, Athletes
 Celia Southward, Achiever

2012
Ann Caine, Builder
Tracey Ferguson, Athlete
Robert Hampson, Achiever
Joyce Thompson, Builder (posthumous)

2013
Raymond Cohen, Builder
David Crombie, Lifetime Achiever
Stephanie Dixon, Athlete
Ramesh Ferris, Achiever
Jerry Johnston and Annie Johnston, Builders

2014
Sudarshan Gautam, Achiever
Hon. Vim Kochhar, Lifetime Achiever
Mark Wafer, Builder
Elisabeth Walker-Young, Achiever
Chris Williamson, Athlete

2015
Lauren Barwick, Builder
Bernard Gluckstein, Achiever
Rick Mercer, Achiever

2016
Marni Abbott-Peter, Athlete
Tim Frick, Builder
Terry Kelly, Achiever

2017
Todd Nicholson, Athlete
Jim Sanders, Builder
Shirley Shelby, Achiever
Rob Snoek, Achiever

2018
James G. Kyte, Athlete
Alvin Law, Achiever
Brian Mulroney, Builder

2019
Bradley Bowden, Athlete
Brian MacPherson, Builder
Richard Peter, Athlete
Tracy Schmitt, Achiever

2020
Tim Cormode, Builder
Martha Sandoval Gustafson, Athlete
Meenu Sikand, Achiever

2021
 Vivian Berkeley, Athlete
 Frank Folino, Achiever
 Carla Qualtrough, Builder

References

External links
 Official site (inductee list)

 
Halls of fame in Canada